"The Rager" is the third episode of The Vampire Diaries's fourth season, premiering October 25, 2012 on The CW.

Plot
While Tyler Lockwood is in the hospital, Connor Jordan sneaks in and subdues him. He takes werewolf venom from Tyler before leaving him unharmed.

Stefan Salvatore wants to give Elena Glbert a fun day due to her transition going badly. Damon wants to track down Connor and kill him. Though Stefan offers his help, a proud Damon rejects it. He plans on leaving Mystic Falls afterwards because of the agreement the two made in "Before Sunset"; the brother Elena does not choose leaves town so Elena can fully be with her choice. Stefan's previous action in the last episode (hitting Damon after he fed Elena his blood) makes Damon think Stefan wants him gone, and Stefan tells him to not be dramatic, since Damon arguably deserved it.

As she needs fresh blood, Elena begins to feed on Matt. He is fine with it since he still feels responsible, though Elena is more wary. Matt is surprised that Elena wants to be in school with everything going on, Elena replying she wants to be back so she can have a few hours of peace from everything. She goes to history class with Stefan, which Alaric Saltzman used to teach. Elena's depression quickly turns to annoyance when they discover Rebekah Mikaelson has come back to school as well. She is having a party to break the new curfew rule, and invites Elena and Stefan so they can get past their previous problems. Noticing Rebekah has apparently moved out of Klaus' mansion, Elena makes a snide comment about Klaus being one of the only people who likes her (either aware or unaware of the fact that Klaus has disowned Rebekah for her action in "Growing Pains"). Rebekah responds by making a casual comment about Alaric being absent because she killed him. An angered Elena attempts to stab Rebekah with a pencil, but Rebekah quickly catches it and stabs Elena instead. Elena, with blood staining her sweater, leaves with Stefan. She expresses her anger with surprise at how passionate it is due to her vampirism. They notice Connor is now in the school looking for vampires. Worried, Elena goes into the bathroom to clean up. Rebekah comes in with a compelled classmate bleeding from the neck. She mocks and taunts Elena about her attempts to ignore her bloodlust, and smears blood on Elena's face. Though Elena bears her fangs, she controls herself since Connor is outside. She later meets Stefan and Caroline outside so she can vent her frustration. She wants to use the White Oak stake to kill Rebekah, but calms down and they decide to go to the party to smite Rebekah.

To Tyler's dismay, he finds Klaus has come back; with Connor lurking around, he wants to protect the last of his hybrids the best he can (though admits he does not care for Tyler). Hybrid bodyguards are to watch over Tyler now. To his surprise, Hayley Marshall, a werewolf who helped him with his sire bond named, shows up, having previously assumed that Tyler was dead.

Jeremy and Connor meet again, and he reveals that the only another hunter or potential hunter can see his hunter tattoo. He asks Jeremy for help in killing the vampires of Mystic Falls, noting most of them are attending school. Jeremy reluctantly agrees.

Rebekah tries to apologize to Matt Donovan about her actions for what she has done, but he rebukes her and leaves. He is soon cornered by Connor, who demands to know who is a vampire. Matt tells him Rebekah is so she can die, and Connor knocks him out before leaving.

Damon goes to Connor's trailer and finds the letter Pastor Young left April, talking about a greater evil coming. Damon gets trapped in the trailer by arrows that are attached to bombs so he calls Meredith for help. While Elena and Stefan are at the party, Elena and Rebekah get into another fights with Elena's daylight ring nearly being destroyed by Rebekah. Stefan takes Elena for a ride on his motorcycle, but not before Elena drinks beer that had been poisoned with werewolf venom. They both start getting sick so Stefan calls Klaus and he comes over to help cure Elena. During her hallucinations, Elena sees Damon, and he tells her she may be more like him than she realizes. Rebekah, being an Original, is fine though weakened. To her surprise, April Young helps her clean up the house.

Klaus meets Hayley and, hearing Caroline Forbes at the door with Tyler-who does not tell her Hayley is with him- begins to suspect Tyler and Hayley may have had a brief affair. When he questions Tyler about this Damon calls for Tyler's help in catching Connor. Klaus decides to go instead.

Damon and Klaus set up a trap at the hospital to catch the vampire hunter by shooting the same arrows attached to bombs at him that were in his trailer. Klaus says that he is "One of the five" because of the markings on the stake that the hunter tries to stab him with. The hunter tries to kill them all by exploding the bombs.

Matt comes over to Elena's so she can feed but her rage over the day mixed with her thirst for blood causes her to feed more than normal and almost kills him before Damon stops her and saves him. He compels Matt to forget it and tells Elena that he will show her the "right" way of being a vampire... which is his way. In the last scene you see that Klaus actually saved the hunter and tells him that he is "The most well protected vampire hunter in town."

Reception

Ratings 
When the episode aired on October 25, 2012, the episode was viewed by 2.87 million American viewers.

References

External links 
 Recap from Official Website

2012 American television episodes
The Vampire Diaries (season 4) episodes